Carl Heinrich Bloch (23 May 1834 – 22 February 1890) was a Danish artist.

Biography

He was born in Copenhagen, Denmark, and studied there at the Royal Danish Academy of Art (Det Kongelige Danske Kunstakademi) under Wilhelm Marstrand. Bloch's parents wanted their son to enter what they considered to be a respectable profession – an officer in the Navy. This, however, was not what he wanted. His only interest was drawing and painting, and he was consumed by the idea of becoming an artist. He went to Italy to study art, passing through the Netherlands, where he became acquainted with the work of Rembrandt, which became a major influence on him. Bloch met his wife, Alma Trepka, in Rome, where he married her on 31 May 1868. They were happily married until her early death in 1886.

His early work featured rural scenes from everyday life. From 1859 to 1866, Bloch lived in Italy, and this period was important for the development of his historical style.

His first great success was the exhibition of his "Prometheus Unbound" in Copenhagen in 1865. After the death of Marstrand, he finished the decoration of the ceremonial hall at the University of Copenhagen. The sorrow over losing his wife weighed heavily on Bloch, and being left alone with their eight children after her death was very difficult for him.

In a New Year's letter from 1866 to Bloch, H. C. Andersen wrote the following: "What God has arched on solid rock will not be swept away!" Another letter from Andersen declared "Through your art you add a new step to your Jacob-ladder into immortality."

In a final ode, from a famous author to a famous artist, H.C. Andersen said "Write on the canvas; write your seal on immortality. Then you will become noble here on earth."

He was then commissioned to produce 23 paintings for the King's Chapel at Frederiksborg Palace. These were all scenes from the life of Christ which have become very popular as illustrations. The originals, painted between 1865 and 1879, are still at Frederiksborg Palace.  The altarpieces can be found at Holbæk, Odense, Ugerløse and Copenhagen in Denmark, as well as Löderup, Hörup, and Landskrona in Sweden.

Death and eulogies
Bloch died of cancer on 22 February 1890. His death came as "an abrupt blow for Nordic art" according to an article by Sophus Michaelis. Michaelis stated that "Denmark has lost the artist that indisputably was the greatest among the living." Kyhn stated in his eulogy at Bloch's funeral that "Bloch stays and lives."

A prominent Danish art critic, Karl Madsen, stated that Bloch reached higher toward the great heaven of art than all other Danish art up to that date. Madsen also said "If there is an Elysium, where the giant, rich, warm and noble artist souls meet, there Carl Bloch will sit among the noblest of them all!" (From Carl Bloch Site).

Influence on art of The Church of Jesus Christ of Latter-day Saints

For over 40 years, The Church of Jesus Christ of Latter-day Saints has made heavy use of Bloch's paintings, mostly from the Frederiksborg Palace collection, in its church buildings and printed media. The church has produced films depicting scriptural accounts of Christ's public ministry, using Bloch's paintings as models for the colour, light and overall set design, as well as the movement of the actors in many of the films' scenes. The most notable example of this is the 2000 film The Testaments of One Fold and One Shepherd.

The church's interest in Bloch's work was generally kickstarted with Doyle L. Green, who valued the classically-trained realism of his artwork, as opposed to the trend towards abstraction in contemporary art of the time. It has been further argued that the Protestant lack of iconographic features in his works, as well as the lack of ''Catholic' motifs such as halos and wings, also helped to make his artworks comfortable for Latter-day Saint audiences.

Through the assistance of Danish-born artist Soren Edsberg (born 1945), the acquisition of Christ healing at the pool of Bethesda, [formerly owned by Indre Mission, Copenhagen, Denmark], was made possible for Brigham Young University's (BYU) Museum of Art. A second work by Bloch, an 1880 grisaille version of The Mocking of Christ, was purchased by BYU in June 2015.

Gallery

See also
 Rembrandt
 Hans Christian Andersen

References 

Biography and Online Gallery of Carl Bloch, Hope Gallery and CarlBlock.com, 2007, retrieved on: July 22, 2007

External links

 www.CarlBloch.org 43 paintings by Carl Heinrich Bloch
 Life of Christ: The Art of Carl Bloch
 Carl Bloch: The Master's Hand - information about Bloch and an exhibition about him at Brigham Young University Museum of Art

1834 births
1890 deaths
19th-century Danish painters
Danish history painters
Artists from Copenhagen
Danish male painters
Royal Danish Academy of Fine Arts alumni
19th-century painters of historical subjects
19th-century Danish male artists